Corgathalia is a genus of moths of the family Noctuidae. The genus was erected by Emilio Berio in 1966.

Species
Corgathalia hirutae Hacker, Fiebig & Stadie, 2019 Madagascar
Corgathalia mazoatra (Viette, 1962) Madagascar
Corgathalia minutiola Hacker, 2019 Zambia
Corgathalia ochsei Hacker, 2019 Uganda
Corgathalia viettei Berio, 1966 Madagascar

References

External links

Acontiinae